Mylothris polychroma is a butterfly in the family Pieridae. It is found in the eastern part of the Democratic Republic of the Congo (southern Kivu and Tanganika), Rwanda and Burundi. The habitat consists of forests and forest margins.

References

Butterflies described in 1981
Pierini